Jorge Fernández (Jorge Yadián Fernández Hernández; born 2 October 1987 in Cárdenas, Matanzas) is a Cuban track and field athlete who competes in the discus throw. He won the gold medal in the event at the Pan American Games in 2011 and is a two-time winner at the Central American and Caribbean Championships in Athletics (2008 and 2009). His personal best throw is 66.50 m, set in Lausanne in 2014.

Career
Born in Matanzas, Fernández won his first international medal at the 2005 Pan American Junior Athletics Championships, where he came second in the discus behind Ryan Whiting of the United States. That same year, he threw a Caribbean junior best of 58.12 m with the 1.75 kg discus. He also competed with the senior implement and was third at the national championships and sixth at the 2005 ALBA Games. In 2006, he improved to set a national junior record of 60.06 m and finished fifth at the 2006 World Junior Championships in Athletics in Beijing.

In his first year as a senior athlete, he set a personal best of 57.57 m and won the discus title at the 2007 ALBA Games. He cleared the 60 m mark numerous times in 2008, setting a new personal best of 63.31 m in Havana in June. He was chosen to compete at the 2008 Central American and Caribbean Championships and came away with the gold medal, finishing just ahead of fellow Cuban Yunior Lastre. Fernández made his Olympic debut at the age of twenty a month later and finished 15th in his qualifying group at the 2008 Beijing Games.

His 2009 season was entirely based in Havana: he won the discus titles at the 2009 ALBA Games and then the Barrientos Memorial. He threw a new personal record mark of 63.92 m in June. The 2009 CAC Championships was held in the Cuban capital and he defended his region title to lead a discus 1–2 for the host nation alongside his compatriot Lastre. In the early part of 2010, he had a throw of 64.13 m then threw 66.00 m exactly in March in Havana. He won the Barrientos meet and the national championships before going on to take the bronze medal for Cuba at the 2010 Ibero-American Championships in Athletics in San Fernando, Cádiz. At the end of the track and field season, he was selected to represent a combined Americas team at the 2010 IAAF Continental Cup and he finished the competition in sixth place with a throw of 61.18 m.

Fernández started the 2011 season in strong form, throwing 65.54 m at the Copa Cuba meeting in March and winning at the Barrientos Memorial with a throw of 64.77 m in May. In his first year based in Europe, he had a season's best throw of 65.89 m came in Cottbus in June and won the Weltklasse in Biberach and Meeting de Atletismo Madrid competitions. At the 2011 World Championships in Athletics he was fourth in qualifying with a mark of 64.94 m, but fell short of this in the final, ending the final in eighth place with a best mark of 63.54 m. His year ended on a high as he won the gold medal at the 2011 Pan American Games in Guadalajara – his winning throw of 65.58 m was the best seen at the tournament in 24 years and he became the third Cuban to take the men's Pan American discus title (joining Roberto Moya and Luis Delís).

Personal best

Competition record

References

External links
 

Living people
1987 births
Sportspeople from Matanzas
Cuban male discus throwers
Olympic athletes of Cuba
Athletes (track and field) at the 2008 Summer Olympics
Athletes (track and field) at the 2012 Summer Olympics
Athletes (track and field) at the 2016 Summer Olympics
Athletes (track and field) at the 2011 Pan American Games
Athletes (track and field) at the 2015 Pan American Games
Athletes (track and field) at the 2019 Pan American Games
Pan American Games gold medalists for Cuba
Pan American Games medalists in athletics (track and field)
Central American and Caribbean Games gold medalists for Cuba
Central American and Caribbean Games silver medalists for Cuba
Competitors at the 2014 Central American and Caribbean Games
Competitors at the 2018 Central American and Caribbean Games
Central American and Caribbean Games medalists in athletics
Medalists at the 2011 Pan American Games
21st-century Cuban people